Sohel Hossain (born 27 August 1979) is a Bangladeshi first-class cricketer who played for Dhaka Division.

References

External links
 

1979 births
Living people
Bangladeshi cricketers
Dhaka Division cricketers
People from Narayanganj District